São José is a neighborhood in the Brazilian city of Paulínia.  The city had 12,653 inhabitants as of 2008.

Neighbourhoods in Paulínia